You Kill Me is 2007 crime comedy film directed by John Dahl and starring Ben Kingsley, Téa Leoni, Luke Wilson, and Dennis Farina.

Plot
Frank Falenczyk is a hit man for his Polish mob family in Buffalo, New York. He has a drinking problem, and when he messes up a critical assignment that puts the family business in peril, his uncle Roman Krzeminski, head of the family, sends him to San Francisco to clean up his act. Falenczyk is forced to accept a job at a mortuary, and go to Alcoholics Anonymous meetings, where he confesses his job, explaining that he wants to be free of his drinking problem because it's affecting his ability to kill effectively. He falls in love with Laurel Pearson, a quirky client he meets at the funeral home. Meanwhile, an upstart Irish gang threatens the family snow-plowing business. When violence erupts, Frank returns home to face the rivals. With assistance from Laurel, he manages to suppress the Irish gang.

Cast
 Ben Kingsley as Frank Falenczyk
 Téa Leoni as Laurel Pearson
 Luke Wilson as Tom
 Dennis Farina as Edward O'Leary
 Philip Baker Hall as Roman Krzeminski
 Bill Pullman as Dave
 Marcus Thomas as Stef Krzeminski
 Jayne Eastwood as Kathleen Fitzgerald

Reception
The film was well received by critics, and maintains a 78% rating on Rotten Tomatoes. The consensus reads, "Featuring wonderful performances from Ben Kingsley and Tea Leoni, You Kill Me is a charming, funny take on the familiar inner-lives-of-hit-men premise."

References

External links
 
 
 
 
 

2007 films
2000s crime comedy films
American crime comedy films
2000s English-language films
Films about alcoholism
Films about the Irish Mob
Films directed by John Dahl
Films scored by Marcelo Zarvos
Films set in New York (state)
Films set in San Francisco
Films shot in Winnipeg
Films with screenplays by Christopher Markus and Stephen McFeely
Mafia comedy films
2007 comedy films
2000s American films
English-language crime comedy films